Portneuf Regional Natural Park is a Quebec regional park (Canada) spanning five municipalities in the northwestern part of the Portneuf Regional County Municipality: Saint-Ubalde, Saint-Alban, Saint-Casimir, Portneuf and Rivière-à-Pierre. This park is administered on the basis of a social economy enterprise with the mission of showing visitors around an exceptional territory and contributing to its preservation and enhancement.

The territory of the park is a place of observation, leisure and learning because of the particular geomorphological attractions.

Officially inaugurated in the summer of 2014, this recreational and tourist park covers  made up of public land, municipal and private land. The park’s implementation team had gathered around a common objective: concerted regional management, creating positive spin-offs while preserving the park’s natural character.

Main activities 
The park's activities take place mainly in Saint-Alban, Saint-Ubalde and Saint-Casimir. A portion of Lac Montauban is located in the municipalities of Portneuf and Rivière-à-Pierre.

In all seasons, this park offers various activities focused on nature, including:
 in winter: cross-country skiing, snowshoeing and ice climbing. Note: The Les Portes de l'Enfer cross-country ski center located at 5th range in Saint-Alban offers trails and a heated relay;
 in summer: hiking, hebertism, speleology, climbing, canoe-portage circuit, canoe-camping, kayak, paddle board, rabaska, inflatable raft, fishing, wildlife and nature photography...
Note: Visitors can also snowmobile and drive their ATV / ATV on the trails.

The park also offers group outings in nature. The park has a picnic area, boat ramps, a room for receptions, meetings or conventions.

Main attractions 
This park has 70 km of hiking trails. The 15 trails in the park are:
(Note: The name in French of the path is indicated in parenthesis)

Long and Montauban lakes sector
 The Chutes to Marcotte (Des Chutes à Marcotte): 7.4 km
 The Cooking pots (Des Marmites): 725 m
 The Summits (Des Sommets): 8 km
 The Waterfalls (Des Cascades): 3 km
 The Mountain of the Tour (De la Montagne de la Tour): 5.5 km
 The Noire River (De la rivière Noire): 3 km
 The icebox (De la glacière): 5.6 km
 The Traverse (De la Traverse)

Lakes sector
 The Traverse (De la Traverse): 3.2 km
 The Seven Marvelous (Sept Merveilleux): 9.9 km

Lake Carillon sector
 Montauban trail / Mékinac limit: 1.4 km
 The Bear (De l'Ours): 3.7 km
 The Jay (Du Geai): 5 km
 The Rabit (Du Lièvre): 3,5 km
 The Vison (Du Vison): 2 km
 Bike path / Carillon pedestrian path / Lac Blanc: 5.1 km

Visitors can contemplate the picturesque landscape at the Carillon lake viewpoint or that of the Tour Mountain.

Long and Montauban lakes are the main geomorphological attractions. All around, the park has many other small lakes and rivers where visitors find peace and a special relationship with nature. The imposing and immense cliff of Long Lake is worth the detour.

The park offers an interpretation center, a visit to a former hydroelectric power station and a visit to Le Trou du Diable cave in St. Casimir.

Fauna 
Fauna and flora are omnipresent in the park. This territory is frequented in particular by the peregrine falcon. This park constitutes a containment area for white-tailed deer.

In lakes and rivers, lake trout is present.

Accommodation 
This park provides visitors with:
 rental chalets,
 ready-to-camp tents in the sectors: Lac Long, Lac Carillon and Gorges;
 100 rustic camping sites.

References

External links 
 
 Official site of the "parc naturel régional" (Portneuf Regional Natural Park)

Protected areas of Capitale-Nationale
Protected areas established in 2014
Regional Parks of Quebec